The Gate is a residential tower located at 1 Eyre Street in Sheffield, England. Plans were submitted in 2006 and accepted that year. Construction started in 2007, however the project was placed on hold in January 2009 as a result of the Great Recession. Construction resumed in 2017; The Gate was topped out in 2019, and completed in the summer of 2020.

Originally proposed as an office tower known as 1 Furnival Square, the tower was proposed as a single project also encompassing a  Jurys Inn hotel adjacent, with the two towers sharing ground floor retail space. Construction of the 11-storey hotel continued as a separate project after the office tower was placed on hold, and Jurys Inn Sheffield opened in 2010. The tower was subsequently revived as a residential tower containing university student accommodation, renamed The Gate.

It has four lifts.

References 

Skyscrapers in Sheffield
Buildings and structures in Sheffield
Proposed skyscrapers in England